The men's association football tournament at the 2011 Indian Ocean Island Games (French: Jeux des îles de l'océan Indien 2011) was held in Seychelles. The draw for the football tournament was made in February 2011.

Teams

Match officials

 Comoros
 Ali Adelaïd
 Assistant referees: Mmadi Fassoil, Abdoul Wahid Nafoundine
 Madagascar
 Jean-Pierre Rakotonjanahary
 Assistant referees: Jean Thierry Djaonirina, Eli Jean Aina Rakotoson
 Maldives
 Ali Saleem
 Mauritius
 Rajindraparsad Seechurn
 Assistant referees: Balkrishna Bootun, Vivian Vally
 Mayotte
 Harouna Rassuhi
 Assistant referees: Ali Inraki, Abdallah Mirhani
 Réunion
 Steeve Dubec
 Assistant referees: Thierry Guichard, Julien Sindraye
 Seychelles
 Bernard Camille
 Assistant referees: Steve Marie, Percy Walter Underwood

Venues

Squads

Each association presented a list of at most twenty players to compete in the tournament.

Group stage

Group A

Group B

Knockout stage

Semi-finals

Third place game

Final

Medalists

Final ranking

Per statistical convention in football, matches decided in extra time are counted as wins and losses, while matches decided by penalty shoot-out are counted as draws.

Statistics

Goal scorers
3 goals
 Fabrice Pithia
2 goals
 Yvan Rajoarimanana
 Éric Farro
 Alpha Baldé
 Archille Henriette
 Nelson Laurence
1 goal

 Ibrahim Madîhali
 Athoumane Soulaimane
 Mohamed Arif
 Ibrahim Fazeel
 Shamweel Qasim
 Ahmed Thoriq
 Gurty Calambé
 Jerry Louis
 Abdou Lihariti Antoissi
 Assani Soihirin
 Saïd Yazidou
 Mamoudou Diallo
 Mohamed El Madaghri
 Don Anacoura
 Kevin Betsy
 Karl Hall
 Alex Nibourette

See also
Indian Ocean Island Games
Football at the Indian Ocean Island Games

References

2011
Indian Ocean Games 2011
2011 in Seychelles